Cold Prey (lit. "Open Season") is a 2006 Norwegian slasher film directed by Roar Uthaug. It premiered in Norway on October 13, 2006, received positive reviews, and was hailed as one of the best modern Norwegian horror movies.

In 2017, WWE Studios has acquired the exclusive English-language remake rights to the franchise and has sealed a deal for an option to purchase the screenplay Casey La Scala is writing. The American remake will also be named Cold Prey.

Plot

In Jotunheimen, a boy with a large birthmark covering one eye runs frantically through a blizzard, pursued by an unknown entity. Eventually, his pursuer catches up to him. Despite his pleas, the person proceeds to bury him alive in the snow.

Years later, a young group of friends consisting of Jannicke, her boyfriend Eirik, and their friends, Mikal, Ingunn, and Morten Tobias are going on a snowboarding vacation in Jotunheimen. They drive to a secluded area in the mountains to avoid the crowds. When they arrive at the peak, they immediately begin snowboarding down the mountain slopes.  Morten Tobias suddenly takes a bad fall and breaks his leg. Jannicke takes charge and sets his leg but realizes they cannot care for it properly out in the elements. They also have no cell reception and the car is too far away to get there before dark. Wandering over a hill, they spot a lodge and decide to seek help there.

When they get to the lodge, Eirik discovers that the place is deserted. He breaks in through a window and unlocks a door. As Jannicke looks for medical supplies she comes across a box that contains superglue and a single shotgun shell. Jannicke treats Morten's broken leg with alcohol and the superglue. Eirik, Mikal and Ingunn go explore the abandoned resort, while Jannicke stays to keep Morten company. The three discover the generator, which Eirik fixes, and power is restored to the resort. Afterwards, Mikal and Ingunn run off by themselves. While exploring the various lodge suites, they discover a room in disarray with a bed burnt to cinders. Eirik, on his way back to the parlor, hears a clanking noise from down in the cellar, and assumes it is Mikal and Ingunn. He calls for them to be more careful, but he receives no reply. With the lights back on, music playing and plentiful amounts of food and alcohol, the group relaxes in the parlor. Jannicke finds the hotel's guestbook and discovers that the last guest checked in some time in 1975 and there is a message reading "We hope you find your son". Inside the book, there is a picture of a family that includes the boy with a birthmark over his eye.

The group settles in for the night with Mikal and Ingunn running off to a suite, Jannicke and Eirik cuddling under blankets in the parlor, and Morten Tobias alone on the couch. Making out in bed, Mikal begins to get aggressive and Ingunn shoves him off. He then leaves in a huff. Ingunn hears a strange noise and, thinking it is Mikal returning, enters the hall. She is suddenly attacked by an unknown shape and runs through the halls screaming for help but is drowned out by the music playing in the parlor. Before she can reach Mikal, who is sitting at the bar, she is stabbed by a pickaxe and dragged away.

The next morning, Eirik leaves to go for help and Mikal heads to the suite to apologize to Ingunn. Eirik stumbles across Ingunn's body in the snow. He is then smashed in the head by the blunt end of a pickaxe. Mikal gets no answer from Ingunn so he and Jannicke explore the basement. They find items that were invented long after the lodge closed in the 1970s and become nervous. Jannicke goes to talk to Ingunn and enters the suite to discover it is covered in blood. She brings Mikal and Morten Tobias to the suite just as a blast of wind flows through the hallway from an open door. They realize someone else is in the lodge and barricade themselves in an empty suite. Footsteps are heard in the hall and someone begins to slam against the door, trying to get in. When they eventually leave, Mikal tells Jannicke they should run. She points out that Morten Tobias cannot and Mikal says they should just leave him. Jannicke refuses and Mikal escapes through a window. Jannicke and Morten Tobias watch through the window as Mikal hides in a shed. Suddenly, a massive Mountain Man appears outside wearing animals skins and goggles. He enters the shed and Mikal tries to run, but becomes stuck in a bear trap. The Mountain Man breaks Mikal's neck.

Jannicke drags Morten Tobias to a pantry and tells him to memorize the label on a can until she gets back. She narrowly misses being spotted by the Mountain Man as he drags Mikal's body inside. Jannicke runs to the shed where she finds some skis, a sled, and a shotgun. She runs into the parlor where she picks up the discarded shotgun shell and loads the gun. She goes back to the pantry and tells Morten Tobias that she has a plan.

They go down to the basement where Jannicke kills the generator, alerting the Mountain Man to their whereabouts. Morten Tobias finds a box cutter and puts it in his pocket. Jannicke waits for the Mountain Man to appear so she can shoot him but discovers the keys she gave to Eirik on the floor. When she enters the back room she finds Eirik tied up but alive. Unable to free him, she goes back to wait for the Mountain Man. When he appears, he goes straight into the back room. Jannicke points the gun at him, but he shuts off his flashlight and disappears into darkness. Thinking quickly, Jannicke shuts the door and locks him in the back room but refuses to leave him in there with Eirik. Opening the door, she shoots but is knocked askew by Morten Tobias who realizes the Mountain Man is using Erik as a human shield. The Mountain Man impales Eirik with his pickaxe, killing him. Morten Tobias tells Jannicke to run. He tries to stop the Mountain Man with a saw but to no avail, and The Mountain Man kills him. Jannicke grabs her skis and runs outside into the darkness only to be knocked out by the Mountain Man.

When she awakes, she is on the sled, buried under her dead friends. The Mountain Man brings them to a deep ravine and begins tossing the bodies over one by one. Jannicke grabs the box cutter out of Morten Tobias's pocket and lies still. Jannicke is the last to be dragged off the sled and, as the Mountain Man grabs her, she stabs him in the neck with the box cutter. They struggle over the pickaxe and end up on the ground by the edge of the ravine. As the Mountain Man is about to stab Jannicke, she rips off his goggles revealing a birthmark over his eye. Taken by surprise, the Mountain Man lets his guard down. Jannicke grabs his pickaxe and stabs him in the stomach, sending him over the ravine.

In a flashback, we see the Mountain Man as a boy, running from his pursuer. As he is covered in the snow, he looks up to see the faces of his parents burying him alive.

The Mountain Man hits the bottom of the ravine, surrounded by the bodies of Jannicke's friends. Jannicke, exhausted, collapses into the snow.

Cast
Ingrid Bolsø Berdal as Jannicke
Rolf Kristian Larsen as Morten Tobias
Viktoria Winge as Ingunn
Tomas Alf Larsen as Eirik
Endre Martin Midtstigen as Mikal
Rune Melby as The Mountain Man 
Erik Skjeggedal as Young Mountain Man
Tonie Lunde as Mother
Hallvard Holmen as Father
Tom Green as Extra

Production

The movie was shot at the peak of Jotunheimen. Helicopters flew the 20 tons of equipment to the top of the mountain where the temperature was below −25 degrees Celsius. It took 2 years to shoot the film and another 9 months for special effects and editing.

Release
Cold Prey premiered on October 13, 2006 in Norway and in January 2007 part of the 13. Slamdance Film Festival in Utah, United States. Since February 2015 the video on demand rights are in the United States by Hulu.

Box office
The film was the 9th highest-grossing film of the year in Norway.

The film has been shown in North America at the 2007 Slamdance Film Festival, the 2007 San Francisco International Film Festival, the 2007 Seattle International Film Festival, and the 2007 Montreal World Film Festival, and was also shown as part of the Night of the Dead VII during the annual Leeds International Film Festival, as well as the 2007 London FrightFest Film Festival in the United Kingdom.

Reception

At Kosmorama in Trondheim in 2007, Martin Sundland and Magne Lyngner won Best Producers and Christian Schanning won Best Sound for the film. At the 2007 Grossmann film and wine festival, the film received the "Vicious Cat Award."
Dennis Harvey from Variety gave the film a positive review, calling it "a conventional but nicely handled slasher pic", praising the film's cinematography, likable characters, and scares. Harvey's only criticism was the film's killer which he called "a generic Halloween-y faceless ghoul in goggles and heavy winter wear."
Justin Kerswell from Hysteria Lives! wrote a mixed review, complimenting the film's acting, and characterizations, but criticized its languid pacing and ending. Scott Weinberg of FEARnet believed that the film "works well by force of style, splat, and intensity."

Sequel

The sequel Cold Prey 2 under the direction of Mats Stenberg was released in 2008. The prequel, called Cold Prey 3, was filmed in 2010.

References

External links
 
 
 

2006 films
2006 horror films
2000s slasher films
Norwegian horror films
2000s Norwegian-language films
Norwegian slasher films
Films directed by Roar Uthaug
Films shot in Norway
Films set in Norway
2006 directorial debut films